Tom Carter is a former Australian rugby union player for the New South Wales Waratahs. He played inside centre and made his Super Rugby debut in 2008.

He attended Knox Grammar School and The King's School, playing in the Knox 1st XV from 1999 to 2000. In July 2013, he retired from rugby.

After several years as a senior member of the Sydney University Football Club, Carter currently spends his time as Chairman of Selectors of the Sydney University Cricket Club. Carter continues this role in 2014/15 after playing a role in SUCC winning a Club Championship, and premierships in First, Second and Sixth grade.

References

Australian rugby union players
Living people
Rugby union centres
New South Wales Waratahs players
1983 births
People from Young, New South Wales
Sydney Stars players
Rugby union players from New South Wales